Hoehnea is a genus of plants in the family Lamiaceae, first described with this name in 1939. It is native to South America, primarily southern Brazil and Paraguay.

The genus name of Hoehnea is in honour of Frederico Carlos Hoehne (1882-1959), who was a Brazilian botanist. It was first described and published in Repert. Spec. Nov. Regni Veg. Beih. Vol.115 on page 8 in 1939.

Species
Hoehnea epilobioides (Epling) Epling - Paraguay, southern Brazil
Hoehnea minima (J.A.Schmidt) Epling - southern Brazil and possibly northern Argentina
Hoehnea parvula (Epling) Epling - southern Brazil 
Hoehnea scutellarioides (Benth.) Epling - southern Brazil

References

Lamiaceae
Lamiaceae genera
Plants described in 1939
Flora of South Brazil
Flora of Paraguay